Jeffrey Remedios is the Chairman and CEO of Universal Music Canada. He also founded Arts & Crafts Records. In 2015 he was named by Toronto Life as one of Toronto's 50 most influential people.

Career 

Remedios began his post-school career in music at Virgin Music Canada (later EMI Music Canada), holding various posts, including Media & Artist Relations, Digital Marketing, and Director of National Promotion.

Arts & Crafts 
In 2003, Jeffrey Remedios left EMI and launched Arts & Crafts Productions with Daniel Cutler and Kevin Drew. The goal of the new label was to create a vehicle to release and promote content from Kevin Drew's new group, Broken Social Scene. Under Remedios' leadership, Arts & Crafts Productions collected 21 Juno wins.

Universal Music Canada 
On September 21, 2015, Universal Music Group CEO Lucian Grainge appointed Remedios as President and CEO of Universal Music Canada.

Professional Associations 
Remedios serves on the board of directors of the Canadian Academy of Recording Arts and Sciences, Music Canada, the City of Toronto Music Advisory Council, the Toronto International Film Festival, the Canadian Opera Company, and the Art Gallery of Ontario.

Education
He graduated McMaster University  in 1998 with an Honours Commerce Degree and a minor in Music. McMaster presented Remedios with its Alumni Gallery Award in 2013.

Personal life 
In 2015 Remedios married Lucia Graca  at a ceremony in Burl's Creek Event Grounds, site of the Wayhome and Boots And Hearts music festivals. Their wedding reception included musical performances by several artists from the Arts & Crafts label. Toronto Life magazine named the couple among the city's Best Dressed in 2016.

References 

Canadian chief executives
McMaster University alumni
Living people
Year of birth missing (living people)